Weddings Are Wonderful is a 1938 British comedy film directed by Maclean Rogers and starring June Clyde, Esmond Knight and René Ray. It was made at Walton Studios.

Synopsis
When she discovers that he has been cut off by his father without a penny, the gold-digging singer Cora Sutherland abandons her fiancée Guy Rogers. However the same night he meets and falls in love with a young woman, Betty Leadbetter, who has taken shelter in his flat after escaping from a raid on a gambling club. Guy must persuade her strait-laced mother to allow them to marry while trying to fend off Cora who has heard about the relationship and sports an opportunity for blackmail.

Cast
 June Clyde as Cora Sutherland  
 Esmond Knight as Guy Rogers  
 René Ray as Betty Leadbetter  
 Frederick Lloyd as Mr. Leadbetter  
 Bertha Belmore as Mrs. Leadbetter  
 Bruce Seton as John Smith  
 Anthony Holles as Adolph  
 George Carney as Rogers 
 Eliot Makeham as Minor role  
 Muriel George as Betty's maid

References

Bibliography
 Low, Rachael. Filmmaking in 1930s Britain. George Allen & Unwin, 1985.
 Wood, Linda. British Films, 1927-1939. British Film Institute, 1986.

External links

1938 films
British comedy films
1938 comedy films
Films directed by Maclean Rogers
Films shot at Nettlefold Studios
Films set in London
British black-and-white films
1930s English-language films
1930s British films